Tamman and Hüttig Temperature is an approximation of the absolute temperature at which atoms in the crystal lattice or on the surface (Hüttig) of a bulk solid material become  "loosened" and therefore more reactive or susceptible to a diffusion by other molecules. It's approximately equal to a half (Tamman) and a third (Hüttig) of a compound's absolute melting point.

A crystalline lattice of a solid compound maintains constant vibrational motion at normal room temperature. As the temperature increases, the amplitude of motion of the ions in the lattice also increases until the melting point is reached and the material transitions to a liquid phase. At this temperature approximately 70% of ions (atoms) in the lattice have the same freedom of motion that they have at the melting point, therefore allowing for diffusion of other particles, increasing the chances of a chemical reaction.

Tamman and Hüttig temperatures are an important factor for some compounds like explosives and fuel oxiders, e.g., potassium chlorate (KClO3) potassium nitrate (KNO3, Tt=), sodium nitrate (NaNO3, Tt ) that may react at surprisingly lower temperatures than one would expect.

The bulk compounds should be contrasted with nanoparticles that exhibit melting-point depression effect, and therefore significantly lower melting points (as well as lower Tammann and Hüttig temperatures) due to smaller molecular radii. This notion is important in regards to sintering process.

History 
Tamman Temperature was pioneered by German astronomer, solid-state chemistry, and physics professor Gustav Tammann in the first half of the 20th century. He considered a lattice motion important for the reactivity of matter and quantified his theory by calculating a ratio of the given material temperatures at solid-liquid phases at absolute temperatures. The division of a solid's temperature by a melting point would yield a Tamman temperature. The value is usually measured in Kelvins (K): 

  

where  is a constant dimensionless number.

Definition 

 Hüttig temperature is

  — A temperature necessary for metal or metal oxide surface recrystallization.
 Tamman temperature is

  — A temperature necessary for metal or metal oxide lattice (bulk) recrystallization.

where:

  — An absolute melting temperature for a given compound expressed in Kelvin (K) units.

Examples 
Below are examples of some compounds' pre-calculated approximations of Tamman and Hüttig temperatures.

See also

Notes

References 

Heat_transfer
Thermodynamic properties